Bass control may refer to:
Bass management
Tone control circuit